The Men's road time trial at the 2008 Summer Olympics took place on 13 August at the Urban Road Cycling Course. It was won by Fabian Cancellara of Switzerland.

Pre-race favorites

Included among the favorites for victory were Cancellara, the reigning world time trial champion, and Germany's Stefan Schumacher, who won both time trials in the 2008 Tour de France, defeating Cancellara in each. Other cyclists considered to be possible medalists included American Dave Zabriskie, and Australians Michael Rogers and Cadel Evans. Evans had originally announced that he was withdrawing from the time trial with a knee injury, giving his place in the event to Rogers, but he recovered faster than expected. The UCI thus gave him a wildcard entry to let him compete. American Levi Leipheimer, Spaniard Alberto Contador, Italy's Marzio Bruseghin and Denis Menchov of Russia were also thought to be contenders for the podium.

The event
The men's road time trial took place on a mountainous 47.6 km course consisting of two 23.8 km laps each containing an approximately 305 m climb followed by an equal descent. The 39 riders in the time trial were broken into three groups, who would race the clock one hour separate from one another. Most of the medal favorites were in the last group. Each rider started the course a minute and thirty seconds after the rider who went before them.

The leader at the end of the first group of 13 was Svein Tuft (Canada), completing the course in 1h 04' 39". This was 23 seconds clear of the next closest competitor Robert Gesink (Netherlands). They were still the top two riders after the second group, with American David Zabriskie and Russian Denis Menchov, thought to be podium contenders, both turning in disappointing rides.

The medalists all came in the third group. Gustav Larsson of Sweden, starting seventh from the end, beat Tuft by nearly two minutes. The man after Larsson, American Levi Leipheimer, was 36 seconds slower than Larsson, but held on to win bronze. The event's prohibitive favorite, world time trial champion Fabian Cancellara, started last, and though he was six seconds behind Larson's pace at the final time check, he wound up winning the gold medal by a margin of 33 seconds. The other major gold medal favorite, Stefan Schumacher of Germany, finished over three minutes behind Cancellara.

Final classification

References

External links
Official page on the Beijing 2008 website

Road cycling at the 2008 Summer Olympics
Cycling at the Summer Olympics – Men's individual time trial
Men's events at the 2008 Summer Olympics